Shima Tamura is a traditional Japanese ryokan founded in 1563 and located near the Shima Onsen in Nakanojō town, Gunma Prefecture.

Shima Onsen is one of the top onsens (hot spring baths) in Japan, because it can cure  many diseases.

See also 
List of oldest companies

References 

Article contains translated text from 四万温泉 on the Japanese Wikipedia retrieved on 23 March 2017.

External links 
Homepage

Hotels in Gunma Prefecture
Restaurants in Japan
Companies established in the 16th century
1560s establishments in Japan